Saeed Shahram is a noted composer with over 60 feature-length movie soundtracks to his credit since 1983.
His accomplishments include awards for the film "Two Sides of a Coin" and "Abadanies", the latter winning the prize for Best Film at the 1994 International Film Festival in Locarno, Switzerland. He studied composition, electronic music, and completed Dastgah under Mr. Pour Torab and Master Karimi in 1983. He has been composing full-time since then. Shahram moved to the United States in 1994 and has been traveling back to Iran periodically, especially since 2006, to compose a variety of scores for award-winning films, such as "Lonesome Trees" director Saeed Ebrahimefar. Currently, Shahram has several scores for film and television projects in production. He resides in Seattle, Washington and has been serving on the board of the Seattle Composers Alliance since 2001. He is also a member of ASCAP.

Works
Compositions:

2016-2019 “Aunti Frog”
Puppet feature film,
Tehran/Seattle USA

2016 "Kalileh and Demneh" Animation feature film- Tehran, Iran/ Seattle, USA

2015-2016  GITA" -Feature Film- Seattle, USA/ Tehran, Iran

2009 Paye Piyadeh - Feature Film - Tehran, Iran

2008 Life of Garib (روزگار قریب) - TV Series, 37 Episodes - Tehran, Iran

2008 Predicament - Feature Film - Tehran, Iran

2008 (Winter Sleep) - Feature Film - Tehran, Iran

2008 (Amnesia) - Feature Film - Tehran, Iran

2007 (the Music Box) - Feature Film - Tehran, Iran

2007 (Virtual Truth) - Feature Film - Tehran, Iran

2007 (Higher than the Sky) - Feature Film - Tehran, Iran

2006 Tak Derakht-ha (Lonesome Trees) - Feature Film - Tehran, Iran

2006 Vaghti Hame Khab Boodan (When All Were Sleeping) - Feature Film - Tehran, Iran

2006 Movajehe (Encounter) - Feature Film - Tehran, Iran

2005  (5pm at Ferdos Park) - Feature Film - Tehran, Iran

2005 "Tardast" - Feature Film-Tehran,Iran

2005 Aroose Farari (the Runaway Bride) - Feature Film - Tehran, Iran

2005 Seattle Transportation - TV Series, 1 Episode - Seattle, WA

2002 The Butterfly - Theatrical Play - Seattle, WA

2002 Kelvin Design - commercial, Farinaz Taghavi (designer) - Seattle, WA

2000 On the footsteps in our fatherland - Documentary Film - New York, NY

1998 Yves Saint Laurent (YSL) - Commercial Film - Seattle, WA

1997-98 Career Advantage- 26 episode TV Series for KCSM-TV - San Francisco, San Jose, San Mateo - CA

1997 Seattle train station - Documentary Film - Seattle, WA

1997 Hotel carton - Feature Film International Film Festival - Tehran, Iran

1997 White, Black and Gray - TV Series - Tehran, Iran

1996 KCSM-TV - Public TV Logo - San Francisco, San Jose, San Mateo - CA

1995 Rodell- Feature Film - Chicago, Illinois

1994 Abadanis- Feature Film (Silver Leopards Award and Crystal Deer Award) - Tehran, Iran

1994 The Sting - Feature Film - Tehran, Iran

1994 Two Sides of a Coin - Feature Film (Crystal Deer Award) - Tehran, Iran

Recordings:

2004 Bright Colors of Hope (Composed, conducted and arranged) World Jazz and operatic - Seattle and San Francisco, WA, CA.

2002 Amordad (Composed, conducted and arranged) Cultural Anthems Seattle, WA

1999–present Stand On the Earth (Composed, conducted and arranged) World Jazz, Seattle, WA

2001 Gatha(Produced, arranged and conducted) Zoroastrian Anthems Vancouver, BC

2001 New Seed (Composed) World Music, Seattle, WA and Mexico

1998-2000 Ancient Whispers (Composed, conducted and arranged) Zoroastrian Anthems, Seattle, WA

1997 Ceremony of the soul (Produced, Arranged and Conducted) World Music, Seattle, WA

1996 Invisible Borders (Composed, conducted and arranged) New Age, San Francisco, CA

Publications:

2000 Talking rhythm'' Mexico and USA

References

http://www.saeedshahram.com/
http://www.imdb.com/name/nm0002284/
https://web.archive.org/web/20080705162613/http://www.seattlecomposers.org/about/bios/saeed_shahram.html

1961 births
Living people
Iranian composers
American film score composers
American male film score composers
Iranian film score composers
Iranian emigrants to the United States